Lê Văn Trương (born 20 February 1983) is a retired Vietnamese footballer who played as a defender. He was a member of the Vietnam national team.

References 

1983 births
Living people
Vietnamese footballers
Association football defenders
V.League 1 players
Hoang Anh Gia Lai FC players
Vietnam international footballers